Atomic Soul is Symphony X's lead singer Russell Allen's debut solo album. It was released on April 26, 2005. The album is different from Symphony X's harder, more progressive sound, and has been dubbed by many, including Allen himself, as "Hard Rock". The album was released in 2005 on the InsideOut Music label. Allen played bass and keyboards on most tracks, along with vocals, but some of the tracks feature guests Robert Nelson on drums, Brendan Anthony and Jason Freudberg on guitars, Larry Salvatore on bass and Jens Johansson on keyboards. Also Allen's bandmates Michael Romeo and Michael Pinnella, from Symphony X, are featured on the album.

Track listing
All songs written by Russell Allen, except where noted.

Blackout - 4:25 (Allen, Brendan Anthony, Iceberg, Robert Nelson, Larry Salvatore)
Unjustified - 3:43 (Allen, Anthony, Nelson)
Voodoo Hand - 3:54
Angel - 5:14
The Distance - 4:49 (Allen, Anthony, Nelson)
Seasons of Insanity - 4:20
Gaia - 4:33
Loosin' You - 4:01
Saucey Jack - 4:02
We Will Fly - 7:55
Atomic Soul - 3:08

Personnel
Russell Allen: Vocals, Bass & Acoustic Guitars, Keyboards
Brendan Anthony: Electric & Acoustic Guitars
Jason Freudberg: Electric & Acoustic Guitars
Iceberg: Electric & Acoustic Guitars
Michael Romeo: Electric, Slide & Bass Guitars
Larry Salvatore: Bass
Michael Pinnella: Piano
Jens Johansson: Keyboards
Robert Nelson: Drums, Percussion

Production
Arranged By Russell Allen, Brendan Anthony & Robert Nelson
Produced By Russell Allen
Recorded & Engineered By Michael Romeo
Mixed By Russell Allen & Don Sternecker
Mastered By Allen Douches

External links
[ "Atomic Soul" overview at allmusic] Retrieved June 28, 2010

2005 debut albums
Inside Out Music albums